John D. Lamontagne is a United States Air Force lieutenant general who serves as the deputy commander of the United States Air Forces in Europe – Air Forces Africa. He previously served as the chief of staff of the United States European Command.

References

Living people
Place of birth missing (living people)
Recipients of the Defense Superior Service Medal
Recipients of the Legion of Merit
United States Air Force generals
Year of birth missing (living people)